General Ulises Rosales del Toro (born March 8, 1942), is a Cuban politician. He is the former Cuban Minister of Agriculture (2008–2010).

Early life 
He serves in Cuba's Politburo of the Communist Party of Cuba and he has served as chief of the general staff of the armed forces. He previously held the position of sugar minister. He has been Cuban Vice President since 19 February 2009.

References
 The Miami Herald, Cuban Economy: Purge Aims to Halt Cuba's Economic Free Fall, Sunday March 8, 2009, Page 1A.
Behind Raul, generals rule

External links
https://web.archive.org/web/20090306080555/http://www.granma.cubaweb.cu/pdf/martes/pagina5.pdf
https://web.archive.org/web/20071011123545/http://wtopnews.com/?nid=105
https://abcnews.go.com/International/wireStory?id=6992631
https://www.reuters.com/article/worldNews/idUSTRE52868R20090309
https://web.archive.org/web/20090401152243/http://www.periodico26.cu/english/news_cuba/mar2009/official-note030209.html
http://www.embacubalebanon.com/cur_min1.html
https://web.archive.org/web/20110929114940/http://www.cadenagramonte.cubaweb.cu/index.php?option=com_content&view=article&id=7688:cuba-designa-nuevo-ministro-de-la-agricultura&catid=2:nacionales&Itemid=50

Government ministers of Cuba
Living people
1942 births
Communist Party of Cuba politicians
Cuban military personnel
Military Academy of the General Staff of the Armed Forces of the Soviet Union alumni